Rylsky (masculine), Rylskaya (feminine), or Rylskoye (neuter) may refer to:

People
Maksym Rylsky (1895–1964), Ukrainian-Soviet poet
Yakov Rylsky (1928–1999), Soviet Olympic and world champion sabre fencer

Places
Rylsky District, a district of Kursk Oblast, Russia
Rylskoye, a rural locality (a village) in Tula Oblast, Russia

See also
Rilski (disambiguation)
Rylsk (disambiguation)